Laila  is a village in the southern state of Karnataka, India. It is located in the Beltangadi taluk of Dakshina Kannada district.

Demographics
 India census, Laila had a population of 7280 with 3610 males and 3670 females.

See also
 Mangalore
 Dakshina Kannada
 Districts of Karnataka

References

External links
 http://dk.nic.in/

Villages in Dakshina Kannada district